Bisakol (portmanteau of Bisaya and Bikol) is an informal term for the three Bisayan languages spoken in the Bicol Region.

These languages include Sorsoganon, a group of Warayan speech varieties of Sorsogon, namely Central Sorsogon (Masbate Sorsogon) and Southern Sorsogon (Waray Sorsogon). The latter is spoken in seven municipalities in Southern Sorsogon, viz. Matnog, Gubat, Bulan, Irosin, Sta. Magdalena, Barcelona and Bulusan. Southern Sorsogon is closely related to the Waray spoken in Northern Samar.

Masbateño of Masbate is closer to the languages of Panay, Capiznon and Hiligaynon.  It retains Bicolano influence from its inclusion in the Bicol Region, both politically and geographically.  Despite its name, Masbate Sorsogon is closer to Waray than to Masbatenyo, but this coast of Sorsogon Bay where Masbate Sorsogon is spoken has had a lot of contact with Masbate Island.

On the Ethnologue map of the region, Masbate Sorsogon is 82, Masbatenyo is 85 and Waray Sorsogon is 83.

Classification 
According to Zorc, the Bisakol languages all classify under the Central Bisayan group.

Vocabulary 
The following examples are taken from McFarland, in comparison with other Bikol area dialects as well as some Bisayan languages from Zorc.

Pronouns

References

Visayan languages
Language contact
Languages of Sorsogon